Henri Monnot was a French sailor who represented his country at the 1900 Summer Olympics in Meulan, France. With crew Léon Tellier and Gaston Cailleux and himself as helmsman, he took 3rd place in the first race of the 0 to 0.5 ton and finished 4th in the second race.

References

Further reading

External links

French male sailors (sport)
Sailors at the 1900 Summer Olympics – 0 to .5 ton
Olympic sailors of France
Year of birth missing
Year of death missing
Olympic bronze medalists for France
Olympic medalists in sailing
Place of birth missing
Place of death missing
Sailors at the 1900 Summer Olympics – Open class